The Tasmanian House of Assembly has five divisions, with five members each. The boundaries are the same as those used for the federal House of Representatives.

Current divisions
The five Tasmanian House of Assembly divisions as of the 2018 redistribution are:

Abolished Divisions
Division of Darwin (1903–1955)
Division of Denison (1909–2018)
Division of Wilmot (1903–1984)

Members

See also

 Tasmanian Legislative Council electoral divisions

References

External links
 Parliament of Tasmania
 Tasmanian Electoral Commission

 
Tasmanian House of Assembly